The Bureau international des expositions (BIE; English: International Bureau of Expositions) is an intergovernmental organization created to supervise international exhibitions (also known as expos or world expos) falling under the jurisdiction of the Convention Relating to International Exhibitions.

Founding and purpose
The BIE was established by the Convention Relating to International Exhibitions, signed in Paris on 22 November 1928, with the following goals:
to oversee the calendar, the bidding, the selection and the organization of World Expositions; and
to establish a regulatory framework under which Expo organizers and participants may work together under the best conditions.

Today, 170 member countries have adhered to the BIE Convention.

The BIE regulates two types of expositions: Registered Exhibitions (commonly called World Expos) and Recognized Exhibitions (commonly called Specialized Expositions). Horticultural Exhibitions with an A1 grade, regulated by the International Association of Horticultural Producers, are recognized since 1960.

The Bureau International des Expositions also recognises the Milan Triennial Exhibition of Decorative Arts and Modern Architecture, on grounds of historical precedence, provided that it retains its original features.

Expo categories

History
Since the creation of the BIE in 1928, different protocols have governed Expo categories, which are generally split between World Expos and Specialised Expos. The rules for each category define the duration, the frequency, the size, and the construction attributes of each Expo.

Under the original protocol of the 1928 Paris Convention, the BIE recognised two types of Expos:

 General Exhibitions (also known as World Expos), which were divided into:
 1st category
 2nd category 
 Special Exhibitions (also known as Specialised Expos)

The Protocol of 30 November 1972 revised the original Convention, entering into force in 1980. Under these new rules, two types of Expos were recognised:
 World Exhibitions (also known as World Expos)
 Specialised Exhibitions (also known as Specialised Expos)

A new amendment was adopted in 1988 and ratified in 1996, further distinguishing the two types of Expos:
 International Registered Exhibitions (commonly referred to as World Expos)
 International Recognised Exhibitions (commonly referred to as Specialised Expos)

Expo 2008 Zaragoza was the first Specialised Expo to be organised under these new rules, which continue to be in force to this day.

The BIE may also grant recognition to A1 Horticultural Exhibitions approved by the International Association of Horticultural Producers (AIPH) since 1960, and to the Triennale di Milano since 1933.

World Expos 
According to the 1988 Amendment of the Convention on International Exhibitions, World Expos (formally known as International Registered Exhibitions) may occur every five years, and may last up to six months. Countries, international organizations, civil societies, and corporations are allowed to participate in World Expos.  The themes of World Expos address a universal challenge facing humanity, and international participants may design and build their own pavilions. Participants may also opt to customise a pavilion provided by the Organiser or to participate within a joint pavilion, which has lower participation costs. Examples of themes of recent World Expos include "Man and His World" for Expo '67 in Montreal, and "Discovery" for Seville Expo '92, and examples of joint pavilion buildings for a Registered Exposition is the Plaza of America at Seville's Expo '92, which was constructed by the Seville Expo Authority to maximize participation at the World Expo by South American nations. The Plaza of Africa at Seville was constructed for the same purpose.

World Expos are also massive in scale, sometimes 300 or 400 hectares in size (Montreal's Expo 67 was 410 hectares, Osaka's Expo 70 was 330 hectares, Seville's Expo '92 was 215 hectares and Shanghai's Expo 2010, 528 hectares). Pavilions participating at a World Expo can also be large, sometimes 5,000 to 10,000 square metres in size, mini city blocks in themselves and sometimes more than several stories in height. (The Australia Pavilion for Shanghai 2010 was 5,000 square metres, the British Pavilion sat on a 6,000 square metres lot, as did the Canadian Pavilion. The flagship Chinese National Pavilion had 20,000 square metres of exhibition space.)

World Expos have been known to average 200,000 persons per day of visitors - or more - and some 50 to 70 million visitors during their six-month duration. Montreal's Expo 67 attracted 54 million visitors, Osaka's Expo '70, 64 million visitors, the Seville Expo '92, 41 million visitors and Shanghai's Expo 2010 attracted 70 million visitors.

As a result, transport and other infrastructure at a Registered Exposition is an important concern (Seville's World Expo of 1992 boasted cable car, monorail, boat, and bus) and the overall cost for hosting and being represented at a World Expos is quite high, compared to the smaller-scale Specialised Expos.

Specialised Expos 
Specialised Expos (formally known as International Recognised Exhibitions) may occur between World Expos and may have a duration of between three weeks and three months. Countries, international organizations, civil societies, and corporations are allowed to participate but the theme of the Expo must address a precise challenge, e.g. Future Energy (Expo 2017 Astana), or Living Oceans and the Coast (Expo 2012 Yeosu). The pavilions are built by the Organiser and made available to participants who may customise them. The largest pavilion may be no larger than 1,000 square meters, and the Expo site must not exceed an area of twenty-five hectares. For this reason Specialised Expos are cheaper to run than World Expos.

There are blurred lines between Specialized and World Expositions prior to the 1996 amendment of the BIE's constitution. Some Specialized Expos, such as Expo 86 in Vancouver, Expo '85 in Tsukuba, or Hemisfair '68, ran for six months and pulled in greater attendance numbers than their 'World Expo' relatives. Many of these specialized expos also had individual pavilions for their participants or covered a greater exhibition site than other World Expos of the era. According to the new amendment, there were only two World Expos between 1970 and 1992 with over 12 Specialized Expos in that same period. Most of these indeed are smaller exhibitions on a focused theme, but some, such as Expo 86 and Expo 88, were intended as full-fledged World Expos. Others, such as Expo 74, the 1982 World's Fair in Knoxville, or Expo '85, were specialized exhibitions that were promoted as full World Expos.

Member states
170 countries are member states of the BIE:

2021 joiners 
Zimbabwe joined on 5 July 2021, becoming the 170th member.

Former members

Australia
Australia was a signatory to the treaty and won the right to hold the 1988 World Exposition.  In 2015 the Australian Chamber of Commerce and Industry requested that the Department of Foreign Affairs and Trade (Australia) reconsider membership, as the cost was too high and "difficult to demonstrate an appropriate return on investment", and that membership be withdrawn temporarily in 2015. Australia is no longer listed as a member of BIE.

Canada
On October 16, 2012, the Conservative government ended Canada's membership of the BIE when the federal government cancelled its $25,000 per year membership fee as part of “reviewing all spending across government with the aim of reducing the deficit and returning to balanced budgets."

Rejoined members

United States (non-member 2001–2017)
Five International Exhibitions have been sanctioned by the BIE in the United States since World War II: one in the World Expo category – the Century 21 Exposition in Seattle (1962) – and four in the Specialized Expo category – HemisFair '68 in San Antonio, Expo '74 in Spokane, Washington, the 1982 World's Fair in Knoxville, Tennessee and the 1984 Louisiana World Exposition in New Orleans.

The United States' membership in the BIE was revoked in June 2001 due to non-allocation of funds by the U.S. Congress for two years. The withdrawal of the United States from the BIE had a limited impact on the BIE and on the participation of the United States in International Exhibitions: the country hosted pavilions at World Expo 2005 in Aichi Prefecture, Japan, World Expo 2010 in Shanghai, China, Specialised Expo 2012 in Yeosu, South Korea, and World Expo 2015 in Milan, Italy. However, the withdrawal "had strong, adverse consequences for states and localities that wish to host an exposition on U.S. soil. Organizers in at least four states have prepared bids, or are exploring the possibility of preparing bids to host a BIE-affiliated expo." In each case, the bid project was unsuccessful, with non-membership of the BIE hurting the chances of a U.S. bid moving forward.

The U.S. rejoined the organization on 10 May 2017 after President Trump signed the "U.S. Wants to Compete for a World Expo Act" (HR534) into law (Pub.L. 115-32) as Minnesota was looking to host a Specialized Expo in 2023.

Expo mascots

Fictional characters serving as mascots have been used since 1984, starting with Seymore D. Fair as the official mascot of the 1984 Louisiana World Exposition (the name being a pun on "see more of the fair," stemming from the local New Orleans dialect). Seymore D. Fair was followed by many more character mascots over the years, including Curro in Seville Expo '92; Twipsy at Expo 2000 in Hanover; and Haibao at Expo 2010 in Shanghai. The names and designs of Expo mascots are often intended to reflect the exposition's host city in some way.

Symbols

The anthem of the Bureau International des Expositions (BIE) is the starting part of the 4th Movement of Dvořák's Symphony No. 9 in E Minor "From the New World".

See also
 List of world expositions – an annotated list of all Expos sanctioned by the Bureau International des Expositions (BIE)
 List of world's fairs – comprehensive chronological list of world's fairs including fairs not sanctioned by the Bureau International des Expositions (BIE)

References

External links
Official website
Site advocating restoration of USA membership in the BIE
Session of the BIE for Expo 2012 and 2015 presentations on December 19, 2006
ExpoMuseum
ExpoMuseum Mascots

World's fairs
Organizations established in 1928
Intergovernmental organizations established by treaty
Organizations based in Paris
Festival organizations
Festival organizations in Europe